Patrick Jacquemet (born 10 November 1965) is a French professional football manager and former player. He currently serves as the Chief of the Football department for the Oceania Football Confederation (OFC).

Career
He began his career for FC Valence.

In 1999–2000 he coached the A.S. Vénus. Since June 2001 until August 2003 he was a head coach of the Tahiti national football team.

References

External links

Profile at Soccerpunter.com

1965 births
Living people
French footballers
Association football goalkeepers
ASOA Valence players
French football managers
Footballers from Lyon
Tahiti national football team managers
Place of birth missing (living people)
1998 OFC Nations Cup players